The Târnăveni gas field natural gas field is located near Târnăveni in Mureș County. It was discovered in 1950 and developed by Romgaz. It began production in 1955 and produces natural gas and condensates. The total proven reserves of the Târnăveni gas field are around 418 billion cubic feet (12 km³) and production is slated to be around 55 million cubic feet/day (1.55×105m³) in 2010.

References

Natural gas fields in Romania